Rambrouch ( or (locally) ;  is a commune and small town in western Luxembourg, in the canton of Redange. It lies close to the border with Belgium.

Rambrouch was formed on 1 January 1979 from the former communes of Arsdorf, Bigonville, Folschette, and Perlé, all in Redange canton.  The law creating Rambrouch was passed on 27 July 1978.

, the town of Rambrouch, which lies in the centre of the commune, has a population of 379.

Populated places
The commune consists of the following villages:

 Arsdorf Section:
 Arsdorf
 Bilsdorf

 Bigonville Section:
 Bigonville
 Flatzbour
 Bungeref-Poteau
 Martelinville (lieu-dit)

 Folschette Section:
 Eschette
 Folschette
 Hostert
 Rambrouch
 Koetschette
 Schwiedelbrouch
 Napoléonsgaard (lieu-dit)

 Perlé Section:
 Holtz
 Perlé
 Rombach-Martelange
 Haut-Martelange
 Wolwelange

Population

See also 
 Napoléonsgaard Hill

References

External links
 
 Commune of Rambrouch official website

 
Communes in Redange (canton)
Towns in Luxembourg
1979 in Luxembourg